Stephen Barry, Baron Jones  (born 26 June 1938) is a British Labour Party politician who served as a Member of Parliament (MP) from 1970 to 2001, and since then as a life peer.

Early life
Jones was educated at Hawarden Grammar School and Bangor College of Education. A teacher, he was president of the Flint County National Union of Teachers. He also served for two years in the Royal Welsh Fusiliers.

Political career
Jones first stood for Parliament in Northwich in 1966, without success, although he reduced the Conservative majority from 4,385 to 703. He was the Member of Parliament (MP) for East Flintshire from 1970 to 1983.

He was a parliamentary under-secretary of state for Wales from 1974 to 1979, and became MP for Alyn and Deeside in 1983.

In 1994, Jones was appointed by the Prime Minister as a member of the then new Intelligence and Security Committee, on which he served until 2001; when the Committee was dissolved at that year's general election, Jones retired from the House of Commons and was made a life peer with the title Baron Jones, of Deeside in the County of Clwyd, as was Dale Campbell-Savours, who had served on the Committee since 1997. Jones was replaced as Alyn and Deeside MP by Mark Tami.

In the 1999 Queen's Birthday Honours, Jones was made a member of the Privy Council of the United Kingdom.

Other positions
In 2007 he was elected as President of NEWI (Glyndŵr University). He was installed as Chancellor of the university in 2009.

Lord Jones was elected vice president of the charity Attend in 2013 and currently holds this position.

He was also appointed and currently holds the title of President of the Deeside Business Forum, a business advocacy forum for companies based on Deeside Industrial Park.

Lord Jones currently holds the title of President of the Army Cadet Force Association Wales, and is an avid supporter of the Army Cadet Force

Personal life
Jones is a lifelong fan of Everton Football Club.

References

 
 

 
 

1938 births
Living people
Welsh Labour Party MPs
Members of the Privy Council of the United Kingdom
Labour Party (UK) life peers
Transport and General Workers' Union-sponsored MPs
UK MPs 1970–1974
UK MPs 1974
UK MPs 1974–1979
UK MPs 1979–1983
UK MPs 1983–1987
UK MPs 1987–1992
UK MPs 1992–1997
UK MPs 1997–2001
People from Hawarden
Life peers created by Elizabeth II